The Unger Model is an empirical standard model for near-end crosstalk (NEXT) power spectra as experienced by communication systems over unshielded twisted pair (UTP).

Twisted pair cables are usually grouped together in a binder where they experience crosstalk. Based on empirical observations, Unger  proposed that, at the 1% worst case, the NEXT power spectra , due to a single disturber, can be bounded by

 
while the NEXT power spectra due to 49 disturbers (full binder) can be bounded by

References

See also 
 DSL

Telecommunications